State Road 436 (NM 436) is a  state highway in the US state of New Mexico. NM 436's southern terminus is at NM 187 south of Garfield, and the northern terminus is at NM 187 in Derry.

Major intersections

See also

References

436
Transportation in Sierra County, New Mexico
Transportation in Doña Ana County, New Mexico